The NBR 224 and 420 Classes consisted of six steam locomotives of the 4-4-0 wheel arrangement built by the North British Railway (NBR) in 1871 and 1873.  224 had three claims to fame: it was the first inside-cylinder 4-4-0 engine to run in Great Britain; it was the locomotive involved in the Tay Bridge disaster; and after rebuilding in 1885, it was the only compound-expansion locomotive on the NBR, and one of just three tandem compounds in Britain.

Intended for express passenger trains on the Edinburgh–Glasgow, Edinburgh–Carlisle, and Burntisland–Dundee routes, they handled these well. When trains from London to Edinburgh began to be forwarded via Carlisle over the NBR in mid-1876, these heavier trains were beyond the locomotives' capabilities, and they had to be removed from front-line service on the Carlisle line. Rebuilt between 1885 and 1897, they remained in service until 1914–19.

History
Thomas Wheatley became locomotive superintendent of the North British Railway (NBR) at the start of February 1867. During his tenure of seven years, he provided the NBR with 185 new locomotives; but only eight of these were suitable for hauling express passenger trains, the first two of which were 2-4-0s built in 1869 (the 141 Class), which were considered to be very good engines.

In 1871, Wheatley followed these with two 4-4-0s, nos. 224 and 264, which were built at the NBR's Cowlairs locomotive works. These two locomotives formed the 224 Class. A leading bogie was chosen because of the preponderance of sharp curves on the NBR; the bogie wheels were quite small, at  diameter, and had solid centres, without spokes. The coupled wheels were  diameter, and the other principal dimensions were: cylinders  diameter by  stroke; coupled wheelbase .

No. 224 was the first inside-frame inside-cylinder 4-4-0 to run in Great Britain, and predated the G&SWR 6 Class by some two years, the latter being introduced in July 1873. This layout, the 4-4-0 with inside frames and inside cylinders, became widespread across most of Great Britain, with the Great Western Railway being the only main-line company which did not eventually possess the type. There had been earlier 4-4-0 designs on other railways, but these either had outside cylinders (such as nos. 160 & 161 (built 1860) of the Stockton and Darlington Railway) or outside frames (such as the "Whitby Bogies" (1864–65) of the North Eastern Railway).

No. 224 was used in Fife, which in the days before the construction of the Forth Bridge, was an isolated part of the NBR system.

The 224 Class were followed in 1873 by the four locomotives of Wheatley's 420 Class, nos. 420–3. They were intended for use on the Waverley route, over which an increase of traffic was anticipated: the Midland Railway (MR) were at the time building their Settle–Carlisle line. This route not yet being open, and the English traffic being entirely in the hands of the London and North Western Railway which worked closely in tandem with the Caledonian Railway, the NBR's main rival, the trains over the Waverley route were comparatively light and well within the capabilities of the 420 Class.

The MR opened the Settle and Carlisle line on 1 May 1876, and a through service using that route between London St Pancras and Edinburgh Waverley was introduced at the same time. There were two trains each day in each direction – one in the daytime, and one overnight. Wheatley's successor, Dugald Drummond, offered the opinion that NBR express locomotives of the period were "like skinny chickens, all legs and wings". The 420 Class remained on the Waverley route, but were used on the local trains, which were lighter than the through trains from England.

No. 224 and the Tay Bridge disaster

Until the opening of the Forth Bridge in 1890, passengers from Edinburgh to Dundee would cross the Firth of Forth by a ferry from Granton which connected with trains at Burntisland.

On 28 December 1879, the regular engine for the 1.30 p.m. mail train from Dundee to Burntisland (no. 89 Ladybank of the 88 Class, an 0-4-2T) failed, and no. 224 (which was based at Dundee, and spare at the time) was called out to work the train. It did so without incident on the southbound run, but when working the 5.20 p.m. northbound service later in the day, due to arrive at Dundee a little before 7.30, it was on the Tay Bridge when shortly after 7.13 p.m. the latter collapsed. The driver, David Mitchell, and "stoker" (fireman), John Marshall, of no. 224 had no warning of the impending disaster, and neither closed the regulator nor applied the brakes; they were among the 75 people killed. Despite the fall, the locomotive was relatively undamaged, being protected by the bridge girders which formed a cage around the train as they fell together.

In April 1880, an attempt to recover the locomotive failed when the chains broke. Two days later, a second attempt also failed because the salvage equipment broke after the locomotive had been brought to the surface. One week later, it was recovered, and stood on the bank of the Tay until it was sent to Cowlairs on its own wheels for repairs, after which it was returned to traffic. It gained the nickname "The Diver" as a result of its accident and difficult recovery.

After this, drivers refused to take no. 224 across the second Tay Bridge (which was built to a new design and opened in 1887). However, on the 29th anniversary of the disaster, 28 December 1908, no. 224 was used on the Sunday evening mail to Dundee via the Tay Bridge.

Rebuilding
Matthew Holmes, locomotive superintendent of the NBR between 1882 and 1903, rebuilt no. 224 as a four-cylinder tandem compound in 1885. The engine was given a modified form of Joy valve gear. The chief features of the design had been patented (no. 16,967 of 1884) by W.H. Nesbit (or Nisbet), who was a cousin of Holmes. Although not entirely successful, it did somewhat better than the only two other British tandem compounds – Great Western Railway nos. 7 & 8, of 1886; although the tandem compound system was more widely used in the USA and Russia. No. 224 was rebuilt back into simple expansion form during 1887.

On the NBR, locomotives were generally rebuilt when their boilers wore out. No. 224 received two new boilers in the course of its life: one was fitted by Drummond, the other by Holmes. Holmes ultimately rebuilt all of the locomotives: other than no. 224, nos. 420/1 were rebuilt in 1887, nos. 422/3 in 1890 and no. 264 in 1893. No. 224 then received its third rebuilding in 1897. In later years, no. 224 was used on secondary and branch line trains.

Final years
Every six months, the NBR renumbered some of its older locomotives into a "duplicate list", in order to vacate numbers for new construction. Accordingly, in 1913, nos. 224 and 264 were placed on the duplicate list, becoming nos. 1192/8 respectively; nos. 420–3 were similarly treated in 1914, becoming 1241–4 in the same order. No. 1244 was withdrawn from service in 1914, the others following in 1915 (no. 1241), 1917 (no. 1198), 1918 (nos. 1242/3) and 1919 (no. 1192). These were the only classes of 4-4-0 on the NBR to be completely withdrawn before the 1923 Grouping. As such, they were not among the 183 locomotives of this wheel arrangement which were passed by the NBR to the London and North Eastern Railway when the latter company was formed at the start of 1923 by the amalgamation of the NBR with several other railways.

The number plate from the tender of no. 224 has been preserved at Selkirk Museum.

Summary

The locomotives may have been named after 1875 – it has been stated that Drummond, who replaced Wheatley in 1875, named NBR engines "including those already in service".

Notes

References

Further reading

224
4-4-0 locomotives
Railway locomotives introduced in 1871
Compound locomotives
Scrapped locomotives
Standard gauge steam locomotives of Great Britain
Passenger locomotives